Laura Miller (born 7 December 2001) is a Luxembourger footballer who plays as a midfielder for Belgian Women's Super League club Standard Liège and the Luxembourg women's national team.

International career
Miller made her senior debut for Luxembourg on 3 March 2018 during a 0–5 friendly win against Kosovo.

International goals

References

2001 births
Living people
Women's association football midfielders
Luxembourgian women's footballers
Luxembourg women's international footballers
Luxembourgian expatriate footballers
Luxembourgian expatriate sportspeople in Belgium
Expatriate women's footballers in Belgium
Standard Liège (women) players